The 1980 Missouri gubernatorial election was held on November 4, 1980 and resulted in a victory for the Republican nominee, former Governor Kit Bond, over the Democratic candidate, incumbent Governor Joseph P. Teasdale, and Socialist Workers candidate Helen Savio.

This election was the second in which Kit Bond and Joseph Teasdale faced off, and the third consecutive Missouri gubernatorial election in which Kit Bond was the Republican nominee.

Democratic primary

Candidates
Milton Morris
James Spainhower, State Treasurer
Joseph P. Teasdale, incumbent Governor since 1977

Results

Republican primary

Candidates
Paul Binggeli
Kit Bond, former Governor (1977–81)
Bill Phelps, Lieutenant Governor since 1973
Troy Spencer

Results

General election

Results

References

Gubernatorial
1980
Missouri